The Ligai Duvvumi Tojikiston (Tajiki: Лигаи Дуввуми Тоҷикистон),, or Tajikistan Second League is a football league in Tajikistan, at the third level of importance.

It is operated under the auspices of the Tajikistan Football League Organization and Tajikistan Football Federation. The year of foundation of the Tajikistan First League is 1992.

The Tajikistan Second League is held in the form of regional tournaments.  The winners of these regional tournaments will be able to play in the Tajikistan First League next season. In some seasons, the winners of zonal tournaments play with each other, and the strongest club or clubs get a ticket to the First League.

Regional zones of the Tajikistan Second League:

References

External links 
 Tajikistan Football League Organization official website
  Tajikistan Football Federation official website

Football competitions in Tajikistan
3
Tajikistan
Sports leagues established in 1992
1992 establishments in Tajikistan